Truth to materials is a tenet of modern architecture (as opposed to postmodern architecture), which holds that any material should be used where it is most appropriate and its nature should not be hidden. Concrete, therefore, should not be painted and the means of its construction should be celebrated by, for instance, not sanding away marks left by timber shuttering (béton brut).  As another example, porcelain is infrequently used in the exterior facing of buildings, but one modern example is the Dakin Building, Brisbane, California; therefore, the porcelain panels of this building have been left uncovered by any paint or preservative.

See also 
Arts and Crafts movement
Brutalism
Functionalism (architecture)
Medium specificity

Further reading
Günter Bandmann: Der Wandel der Materialbewertung in der Kunsttheorie des 19. Jahrhunderts, in: Helmut Koopmann, J. Adolf Schmoll gen. Eisenwerth (Ed.): Beiträge zur Theorie der Künste im 19. Jahrhundert, 2 Vol., Vol. 1, Frankfurt/M. 1971, p. 129–157.
Materialstil, Materialstimmung, Materialgerechtigkeit, in: Dietmar Rübel, Monika Wagner, Vera Wolff (Ed.): Materialästhetik. Quellentexte zu Kunst, Design und Architektur, Berlin 2005

Architectural theory
Modernism